Arf-GAP with GTPase, ANK repeat and PH domain-containing protein 2 is a protein that in humans is encoded by the AGAP2 gene.

Interactions 
CENTG1 has been shown to interact with:
 EPB41L1,
 HOMER1  and
 PIK3R1.

References

External links

Further reading